is a professional Japanese baseball player. He is a pitcher for the Yomiuri Giants of Nippon Professional Baseball (NPB).

References 

1999 births
Living people
Baseball people from Hyōgo Prefecture
Nippon Professional Baseball pitchers
Yomiuri Giants players
Nippon Professional Baseball Rookie of the Year Award winners
2023 World Baseball Classic players